Różany may refer to the following places:
Różany, Łódź Voivodeship (central Poland)
Różany, Warmian-Masurian Voivodeship (north Poland)
Różany, West Pomeranian Voivodeship (north-west Poland)